Liebsch is a German language  surname derived from a given name beginning with Lib "beloved, dear". Notable people with the name include:
 Angelika Liebsch (1950), German athlete
 Georg Liebsch (1911–1998), German featherweight weightlifter

References 

German-language surnames
Surnames from given names